Lahna Turner is a stand up comedian and actress. She is primarily known for being married to comedian, Ralphie May.

Early life 
As a child, Turner and her family moved from Canada to Houston, Texas for her father’s career with Exxon. 

Turner attended Texas State University, where she earned her bachelor's degree in fine arts with a focus in photo technology. Turner worked full-time as a photographer throughout her college career. At the age of 19, she started an unofficial internship with the Associated Press, which eventually led to a freelance position with the organization.

Career 
Turner began her comedy career post-college in Houston where she performed three comedic songs at a local open mic night. She booked her first paying gig two months later. In 2004, Turner released her first comedy album, Dick Jokes & Other Assorted Love Songs. She later recorded If These Lips Could Talk (2012), her first one-hour special So…. I Wrote a Song About It (2014) and Limeade (2017), the first ever comedy visual album. Turner’s albums have received airplay at top radio stations across the country as well as National Lampoon's Top 40 comedy countdown, and are in rotation on SiriusXM Satellite Radio. She also has an early, non-comedy album called Life as a Human.

Turner made her big-screen debut in Teacher of the Year where she played Ursula Featherstone. She also appeared in This Is Meg (2017), Brand New Old Love (2018) and is a producer of What’s Eating Ralphie May? (2019). She is also the Executive Producer for the documentary: 360 Degrees Down.

Personal life 
Turner married fellow comedian Ralphie May on July 3, 2005, they have two children together. May died in 2017.

References 

Living people
Texas State University alumni
American people of Canadian descent
People from Houston
Canadian stand-up comedians
Year of birth missing (living people)